The 2016 PSL All-Filipino Conference was the third conference edition and second indoor tournament for the Philippine Super Liga's fourth season. The tournament began on 18 June 2016 at the Filoil Flying V Centre, San Juan. Most matches will be held at Filoil Flying V Centre and Cuneta Astrodome, Pasay.

Teams

Tournament format
Preliminary round
First round: single round-robin.
Second round: Top four teams after the first round are placed in Group A. Bottom four teams are placed in Group B
Final round
Group B will compete for 5th place
Group A will compete for Championship
Best-of-three series Final.

Preliminary round

First round

|}
All times are local Philippine Standard Time–(UTC+08:00)

|}

Second round

Group A

|}

|}

Group B

|}

|}

Final round

Bracket

5th–8th Classification

|}

Semifinals

|}

7th place

|}

5th place

|}

Bronze match

|}

Final

|}

Final standing

Individual awards

Venues
Filoil Flying V Arena (main venue)
Cuneta Astrodome

"Spike on Tour" Venues:
Batangas City Coliseum (July 19)
De La Salle Lipa Sentrum (July 28)
Malolos Sports and Convention Center (August 4)

Broadcast partners
Sports5: AksyonTV, TV5,  Hyper (SD and HD), Sports5.ph

See also
Shakey's V-League 13th Season Open Conference
Spikers' Turf 2nd Season Open Conference

References

All-Filipino
PSL